Joseph or Joe Dalton may refer to:

Joseph Dalton (footballer) (1915–?), English professional footballer
Joseph Dalton (priest) (1817–1905), Irish Jesuit
 Joe Dalton (Lucky Luke), fictional character

See also
 Joseph Dalton Hooker (1817–1911), British botanist and explorer